Pareshkaft-e Darb Kalat (also Romanized as Pareshkaft-e Darb Kalāt; also known as Bar Eshgaft, Pareshkaft, and Pīr Eshkaft) is a village in Sadat Mahmudi Rural District, Pataveh District, Dana County, Kohgiluyeh and Boyer-Ahmad Province, Iran. At the 2006 census, its population was 101, in 25 families.

References 

Populated places in Dana County